Profit, in accounting, is an income distributed to the  owner in a  profitable market production process (business). Profit is a measure of profitability which is the owner's major interest in the income-formation process of market production. There are several profit measures in common use.

Income formation in market production is always a balance between income generation and income distribution. The income generated is always distributed to the stakeholders of production as economic value within the review period. The profit is the share of income formation the owner is able to keep to themselves in the income distribution process. Profit is one of the major sources of  economic well-being because it means incomes and opportunities to develop production. The words "income", "profit" and "earnings" are synonyms in this context.

Measurement of profit
There are several important profit measures in common use. Note that the words earnings, profit and income are used as substitutes in some of these terms.
 Gross profit equals sales revenue minus cost of goods sold (COGS), thus removing only the part of expenses that can be traced directly to the production or purchase of the goods. Gross profit still includes general (overhead) expenses like R&D, S&M, G&A, also interest expense, taxes and extraordinary items.
 Earnings before interest, taxes, depreciation, and amortization (EBITDA) equals sales revenue minus cost of goods sold and all expenses except for interest, amortization, depreciation and taxes. It measures the cash earnings that can be used to pay interest and repay the principal. Since the interest is paid before income tax is calculated, the debt holder can ignore taxes.
 Earnings before interest and taxes (EBIT) or operating profit equals sales revenue minus cost of goods sold and all expenses except for interest and taxes. This is the surplus generated by operations. It is also known as Operating Profit Before Interest and Taxes (OPBIT) or simply Profit Before Interest and Taxes (PBIT).
 Earnings before taxes (EBT) or net profit before tax equals sales revenue minus cost of goods sold and all expenses except for taxes. It is also known as pre-tax book income (PTBI), net operating income before taxes or simply pre-tax income.
 Net income or earnings after tax or net profit after tax equals sales revenue after deducting all expenses, including taxes (unless some distinction about the treatment of extraordinary expenses is made). In the US, the term net income is commonly used. Income before extraordinary expenses represents the same but before adjusting for extraordinary items.
 Retained earnings equals earnings after tax minus payable dividends.

To accountants, economic profit, or EP, is a single-period metric to determine the value created by a company in one period—usually a year. It is earnings after tax less the equity charge, a risk-weighted cost of capital. This is almost identical to the economists' definition of economic profit.

There are analysts who see the benefit in making adjustments to economic profit such as eliminating the effect of amortized goodwill or capitalizing expenditure on brand advertising to show its value over multiple accounting periods. The underlying concept was first introduced by Eugen Schmalenbach, but the commercial application of the concept of adjusted economic profit was by Stern Stewart & Co. which has trade-marked their adjusted economic profit as Economic Value Added (EVA).

Optimum profit is a theoretical measure and denotes the "right" level of profit a business can achieve. In the business, this figure takes account of marketing strategy, market position, and other methods of increasing returns above the competitive rate.

Accounting profits should include economic profits, which are also called economic rents. For instance, a monopoly can have very high economic profits, and those profits might include a rent on some natural resource that a firm owns, whereby that resource cannot be easily duplicated by other firms.

Other terms

See also
 Gross income
 Net profit
 Profitability index
 Rate of return
 Return on assets
 Return on equity
 Rate of profit
 Profit model
 Profit motive

Footnotes

References

Further reading and external links

Moroney, J. R. (1967) Cobb-Douglass production functions and returns to scale in US manufacturing industry, Western Economic Journal, vol 6, no 1, December 1967, pp 39–51.
Pearl, D. and Enos, J. (1975) Engineering production functions and technological progress, The Journal of Industrial Economics, vol 24, September 1975, pp 55–72.
Robinson, J. (1953) The production function and the theory of capital, Review of Economic Studies, vol XXI, 1953, pp. 81–106
Anwar Shaikh, "Laws of Production and Laws of Algebra: The Humbug Production Function", in The Review of Economics and Statistics, Volume 56(1), February 1974, p. 115-120. https://web.archive.org/web/20050518113632/http://homepage.newschool.edu/~AShaikh/humbug.pdf
Anwar Shaikh, "Laws of Production and Laws of Algebra—Humbug II", in Growth, Profits and Property ed. by Edward J. Nell. Cambridge, Cambridge University Press, 1980. https://web.archive.org/web/20050518112119/http://homepage.newschool.edu/~AShaikh/humbug2.pdf
Anwar Shaikh, "Nonlinear Dynamics and Pseudo-Production Functions", published?, 2008. http://college.holycross.edu/eej/Volume31/V31N3P447_466.pdf
Shephard, R (1970) Theory of cost and production functions, Princeton University Press, Princeton NJ.
Thompson, A. (1981) Economics of the firm, Theory and practice, 3rd edition, Prentice Hall, Englewood Cliffs. 
Elmer G. Wiens: Production Functions - Models of the Cobb-Douglas, C.E.S., Trans-Log, and Diewert Production Functions.
 Profit and Loss, Ludwig von Mises (1951)
 Measuring the Long-Run Profitability of the Firm, Salmi and Virtanen (1997)